The 2012 AIK Fotboll season was spent in the Allsvenskan.

Season events

Squad

Transfers

In

Loans in

Out

Loans out

Released

Friendlies

Competitions

Overview

Svenska Supercupen

Allsvenskan

League table

Results summary

Results

Svenska Cupen

The Group Stage took place during the 2013 season.

UEFA Europa League

Qualifying round

Group stage

Squad statistics

Appearances and goals

|-
|colspan="16"|Players away on loan:

|-
|colspan="16"|Players who appeared for AIK but left during the season:

|}

Goal scorers

Clean sheets

Disciplinary record

References

AIK Fotboll seasons
AIK Fotboll season